Ken Barker is an Australian Roman Catholic priest. He is the moderator of the Missionaries of God's Love religious congregation and founder of the Young Men of God Movement.

He received his training to become a priest from St Columba's College, Springwood, NSW and  St Patrick's College, Manly. He finished a degree in theology, graduating with honours. He then returned to the University of Sydney and finished his science degree.

The Missionaries of God's Love (MGL) came into being in 1986 with a base in a suburban house in Canberra. 20 years later, the MGL has more than 40 members, 13 ordained priests, two deacons, 16 at its seminary in Melbourne which is overseen by Fr Chris Ryan. In addition to Canberra and Melbourne, in 2019 the Missionaries of God's Love have missions in Darwin, Sydney, the Philippines and Indonesia.

He is the author of 5 books His Name is Mercy, Becoming Fire, Radical Way of Love, Amazing Love, and the best-selling Young Men Rise Up. His sixth book is called Go Set the World on Fire.

In 2018, after being re-elected as head of the order he told members of his congregation that this would be his last term.

References

21st-century Australian Roman Catholic priests
Roman Catholic missionaries in Australia
Founders of Catholic religious communities
Living people
Catholic University of America alumni
Australian Roman Catholic missionaries
20th-century Australian Roman Catholic priests
1948 births